Tân Phú is a district (huyện) of Đồng Nai province in the Southeast region of Vietnam.

As of 2003 the district had a population of 164,366. The district covers an area of 774 km². The district capital lies at Tân Phú.

Administrative subdivisions 
This district is mostly rural, with the following xã:
Tân Phú town (thị trấn)
Xã Đắc Lua
Xã Nam Cát Tiên
Xã Núi Tượng
Xã Phú An
Xã Phú Bình
Xã Phú Điền
Xã Phú Lâm
Xã Phú Lập
Xã Phú Lộc
Xã Phú Sơn
Xã Phú Thanh
Xã Phú Thịnh
Xã Phú Trung
Xã Phú Xuân
Xã Tà Lài
Xã Thanh Sơn
Xã Trà Cổ

References

Districts of Đồng Nai province